Chet Lagod (January 8, 1928 – October 25, 2013) was an American football guard. He played for the New York Giants in 1953.

He died on October 25, 2013, in Chattanooga, Tennessee at age 85.

References

1928 births
2013 deaths
American football guards
Chattanooga Mocs football players
New York Giants players